Åshild Karlstrøm Rundhaug (born 4 January 1955) is a Norwegian politician for the Conservative Party.

She served as a deputy representative to the Storting from Finnmark during the term 1997–2001. In total she met during 27 days of parliamentary session.

References

1955 births
Living people
Finnmark politicians
Deputy members of the Storting
Conservative Party (Norway) politicians
Place of birth missing (living people)
20th-century Norwegian women politicians
20th-century Norwegian politicians
Women members of the Storting